Helmut Lethen (born 14 January 1939 in Mönchengladbach, Germany) is a German Germanist and cultural scholar.

Career 
Helmut Lethen joined the Bundeswehr as a volunteer after graduating from high school in 1959 and was promoted to lieutenant in the reserves. He studied at universities in Bonn, Amsterdam and Berlin. Lethen was a left wing student activist and was one of the students who disrupted the opening of the Deutscher Germanistentag in West Berlin in 1968. He was a member of the Maoist party KPD-AO until 1975.

Lethen was awarded his doctorate in 1970 on the subject of Neue Sachlichkeit 1924-1932. Studies in the Literature of White Socialism. From 1971 to 1976 he was an assistant at the FU Berlin and from 1977 to 1995 professor in Utrecht; he also held various visiting professorships. In 1995, he was appointed to Rostock, where he was holding a Chair of Modern German Literature from 1996. He became emeritus professor in 2004. From October 2007 to February 2016, he was director of the International Research Centre for Cultural Studies in Vienna. Since 2016, he has held a professorship at the University of Art and Design Linz.

Helmut Lethen became known to a wider audience through his book publications Cool Conduct. The Culture of Distance in Weimar Germany (1994) and Der Sound der Väter (on Gottfried Benn, 2006). In 2014, he received the Leipzig Book Fair Prize in the non-fiction/essay category for Der Schatten des Fotografen.

In October 2020, he published Denn für dieses Leben ist der Mensch nicht schlau genug, his autobiography.

Private life 
Lethen was married to Loes Scholtheis (* 1941) from 1964. The couple separated in 1984. He is now married to Caroline Sommerfeld (* 1975), who has been an activist of the Identitarian movement since 2015. The couple has three sons.

Monographies (selection) 
 Neue Sachlichkeit. 1924–1932. Studien zur Literatur des „Weißen Sozialismus“. Metzler, Stuttgart 1970 (= dissertation at the FU Berlin, 1970).
 Verhaltenslehren der Kälte. Lebensversuche zwischen den Kriegen (= Edition Suhrkamp 1884 = NF 884). Suhrkamp, Frankfurt (Main) 1994, ISBN 3-518-11884-6 (English translation by Don Reneau: Cool Conduct. The Culture of Distance in Weimar Germany (= Weimar and now. Band 17). University of California Press, Berkeley CA a. o. 2002, ISBN 0-520-20109-4).
 Der Sound der Väter. Gottfried Benn und seine Zeit. Rowohlt, Berlin 2006, ISBN 3-87134-544-X.
 Unheimliche Nachbarschaften. Essays zum Kälte-Kult und der Schlaflosigkeit der philosophischen Anthropologie im 20. Jahrhundert (= Rombach Wissenschaften. Edition Parabasen. Band 10). Rombach, Freiburg (Breisgau) a. o. 2009, ISBN 978-3-7930-9599-6.
 Suche nach dem Handorakel. Ein Bericht. Wallstein, Göttingen 2012, ISBN 978-3-8353-1159-6.
 Der Schatten des Fotografen. Bilder und ihre Wirklichkeit. Rowohlt, Berlin 2014, ISBN 978-3-87134-586-9.
 Die Staatsräte. Elite im Dritten Reich: Gründgens, Furtwängler, Sauerbruch, Schmitt. Rowohlt, Berlin 2018, ISBN 978-3-87134-797-9.
 Denn für dieses Leben ist der Mensch nicht schlau genug. Rowohlt, Berlin 2020, ISBN 978-3-7371-0088-5 (Autobiography).
 Der Sommer des Großinquisitors. Über die Faszination des Bösen. Rowohlt, Berlin 2022, ISBN 978-3-7371-0162-2.

References

Web pages 
 
 
 Eintrag zu Helmut Lethen im Catalogus Professorum Rostochiensium
  at the web page of the Universität Rostock
 Kurzbiographie at the web page of the IFK
 Podcastinterview about the book Der Schatten des Fotografen. Bilder und ihre Wirklichkeit from 15 September 2014

Living people
1939 births
Germanists
German writers
People from Mönchengladbach
Academic staff of Utrecht University
Academic staff of the University of Rostock
Academic staff of the University of Arts and Industrial Design Linz